The National Indoor Football League (NIFL) was a professional indoor football league in the United States. For their first six years, the league had teams in markets not covered by either the Arena Football League or its developmental league, AF2, however, that changed briefly with their expansion into AFL markets such as Atlanta, Denver, and Los Angeles, and AF2 markets such as Fort Myers and Houston. Green Bay Packers head coach Matt LaFleur, Buffalo Bills running back Fred Jackson, New Orleans Saints quarterback John Fourcade and Pittsburgh Steelers Super Bowl running back Bam Morris, all played in the NIFL.  The league folded in 2008.

History
The NIFL, based in Lafayette, Louisiana, was founded by Carolyn Shiver. The league started operations in 2001, with many teams coming from Indoor Football League being bought the previous year and folding operations. In 2002, the league added in the teams from the Indoor Professional Football League. 2003 was the most successful year for the league as 24 teams played a mostly complete schedule, with few cancellations.

Before the 2005 season,  nine teams left the league to form United Indoor Football.  That same year, the Intense Football League ceased operations and four teams from there joined the league.  Those teams however, left the league before the 2006 season started.

For the 2005 season, the NIFL had an agreement with NFL to handle referee assignment and training.

The 2006 season, was the most chaotic for the league to that point.  Ten expansion teams were added to the league, but nine of them had problems that reflected badly on the league.  The most notable situation was the owner of the Montgomery Maulers firing the entire team. None of the ten expansion teams returned to the league for the next season.

The 2007 season started with the addition of several league-owned expansion teams, primarily to supplement games with the returning teams.  However, the teams were all poorly funded and had problems fielding competitive squads. On May 11, 2007, the ten independently-owned franchises banded together and left the NIFL. These ten teams played against each other as independents for the remainder of the 2007 season. Of these teams, seven left the league for other leagues. The rest of the teams folded. No playoffs were held at the end of the season. The San Diego Shockwave were declared the official league champion, however, an unofficial championship game was played by the Wyoming Cavalry and Fayetteville Guard, with Fayetteville winning. The league then officially folded prior to the 2008 season.

In 2016, a new website announced that the league operations were relaunched by Carolyn Shiver with announced goal of bringing 34 teams into the former AFL markets starting in the 2017 season. As of June 2016, the league was looking for local team ownership under the league's business model.

Former teams

Teams that left the NIFL to join (or planned to join) another league
Beaumont Drillers – joined APFL in 2008 and has since folded.
Evansville BlueCats – joined United Indoor Football and folded following 2007 season.
Everett Hawks – joined the AF2 in 2007 and has since folded.
Fayetteville Guard – moved to American Indoor Football Association, and have since folded.
Fort Wayne Freedom – joined United Indoor Football, then had assets bought out by Fort Wayne Fusion of AF2.
Greenville Riverhawks – moved to American Indoor Football Association as Johnstown Riverhawks and have since folded.
Katy Copperheads – moved to AF2 as Texas Copperheads and has since folded.
Lexington Horsemen – Joined United Indoor Football then AF2 later changed to Kentucky Horsemen and finally folded.
Montgomery Maulers – moved to American Indoor Football Association as Montgomery Bears and have since folded.
Odessa Roughnecks – moved to Indoor Football League, and have since folded.
Ohio Valley Greyhounds – moved to Indoor Football League, and have since folded.
Omaha Beef – now in Champions Indoor Football
Osceola Football – moved to World Indoor Football League as Osceola Ghostriders, and have since folded.
River City Rage – moved to Indoor Football League, and have since folded.
Rome Renegades – joined American Indoor Football League, then left for World Indoor Football League, but folded before playing a single game there.
San Angelo Stampede – moved to Indoor Football League, and have since folded.
San Diego Shockwave – Has announced going on hiatus for 2008 but planned on joining another league for 2009 and never did.
Sarasota Knights – Moved to APFL as Florida Knights, and have since folded.
Sioux City Bandits – now in Champions Indoor Football.
Sioux Falls Storm – now in Indoor Football League.
Tri-Cities Fever- moved to AF2 and then Indoor Football League and are now dormant.
Tupelo FireAnts – joined United Indoor Football, then folded after one season there.
Wyoming Cavalry (Casper, Wyoming) – moved to Indoor Football League, and have since folded.

Defunct teams/failed expansion
Arkansas Stars
Atlanta Thoroughbreds
Atlantic City CardSharks
Austin Knights
Austin Rockers
Bay Bandits
Big Sky Thunder
Billings Mavericks
Bismarck Roughriders
Black Hills Red Dogs
Charleston Sandsharks
Cincinnati Marshals
Colorado Castle Rocks
Colorado Venom
Colorado Wild Riders
Columbia Stingers
Dayton Bulldogs
Dayton Warbirds
Daytona Beach Hawgs
Denver Aviators
Eugene Mercury
Florida Frenzy
Fort Myers Tarpons
Fort Worth Sixers
Green Cove Lions – Evidently formerly the Jacksonville Stallions, they folded in 2007 before ever playing a home game.
Greensboro Revolution
Hammond Heroes
Houma Bayou Bucks
Houston Wild Riders
Jacksonville Stallions – folded before playing a game, and evidently became the Green Cove Lions.
Johnstown J Dogs
Kissimmee Kreatures
La Crosse Night Train
Lake Charles Land Sharks
Lakeland Thunderbolts – won American Indoor Football Association 2007
Lincoln Capitols
Long Beach Surf
Los Angeles Lynx
Louisiana Bayou Beast
Louisiana Rangers
Louisiana Swashbucklers 
Lubbock Gunslingers
Lubbock Lone Stars
Miami Vice Squad
Mississippi Fire Dogs
Mobile Seagulls
Myrtle Beach Stingrays
New Jersey XTreme
Oklahoma Crude
Pomona Cool Riders
Port St. Lucie Mustangs
Pueblo Pistols
Rapid City Flying Aces
River Cities LocoMotives
River City Renegades
San Bernardino Bucking Bulls
St. Joseph Cyclones
San Antonio Steers
Southern Oregon Heat
Staten Island Xtreme
Tennessee Riverhawks
Tennessee River Sharks
Tennessee ThunderCats
Tri-City Diesel
Tri-Valley Ranchers
Twin City Gators
Utah Express
Utah Rattlers
Utah Warriors
Waco Marshals
Wichita Falls Thunder
Winston-Salem Energy
Yakima Shockwave

Indoor Bowl games

See also 
List of leagues of American football
Indoor Bowl

Notes

External links
 National Indoor Football League official website
 San Antonio Steers vs Beaumont Drillers clip via YouTube

 
Defunct indoor American football leagues in the United States
Sports leagues established in 2001
Sports leagues disestablished in 2008
2001 establishments in the United States
2008 disestablishments in the United States